The following is the final results of the 2000 Asian Wrestling Championships.

Medal table

Team ranking

Medal summary

Men's freestyle

Men's Greco-Roman

Women's freestyle

Participating nations

Men's freestyle
84 competitors from 16 nations competed.

 (8)
 (4)
 (8)
 (2)
 (8)
 (7)
 (4)
 (5)
 (2)
 (6)
 (4)
 (3)
 (8)
 (3)
 (8)
 (4)

Men's Greco-Roman
84 competitors from 15 nations competed.

 (8)
 (7)
 (7)
 (4)
 (8)
 (8)
 (8)
 (5)
 (5)
 (8)
 (4)
 (1)
 (2)
 (8)
 (1)

Women's freestyle
31 competitors from 7 nations competed.

 (6)
 (5)
 (6)
 (2)
 (4)
 (6)
 (2)

References
UWW Database
Women's Complete Results
Greco-Roman Complete Results
Freestyle Complete Results

Asia
W
W
Asian Wrestling Championships
W
International wrestling competitions hosted by South Korea